Old Earth creationism (OEC) is an umbrella of theological views encompassing certain varieties of creationism which may or can include day-age creationism, gap creationism, progressive creationism, and sometimes theistic evolutionism.

Broadly speaking, OEC usually occupies a middle ground between young Earth creationism (YEC) and theistic evolution (TE).  In contrast to YEC, it is typically more compatible with the scientific consensus on the issues of physics, chemistry, geology, and the age of the Earth. However, like YEC and in contrast with TE, some forms of it reject macroevolution, claiming it is biologically untenable and not supported by the fossil record, and the concept of universal descent from a last universal common ancestor.

For a long time Evangelical creationists generally subscribed to Old Earth Creationism until 1960 when John C. Whitcomb and Henry M. Morris published the book The Genesis Flood, which caused the Young Earth creationist view to become prominent.

History 
Augustine interpreted the days of Genesis allegorically, whose view also influenced Gregory the Great, Bede and Isodor of Seville. Augustine was not alone in viewing the days of Genesis as allegorical, others include: Didumyus the Blind, possibly Basil the Great, Clement of Alexandria, Origen and Athanasius, who interpreted the days of the Genesis narrative allegorically.

Cyprian argued that each days of Genesis consisted of 1000 years. Irenaeus and Justin Martyr suggested that the days of Genesis could have been long epochs of 1000 years, quoting Psalm 90:4 and perhaps 2 Peter. 

According to Dr. Hugh Ross, Thomas Aquinas also denied the genesis account as being literal with six 24 hour days.

Thomas Chalmers popularized gap creationism, which is a form of Old Earth Creationism. Additionally it was advocated by the Scofield Reference bible, which caused the theory to survive longer.

Probably the most famous day-age creationist was American politician, anti-evolution campaigner and Scopes Trial prosecutor William Jennings Bryan. Unlike many of his conservative followers, Bryan was not a strict biblical literalist, and had no objection to "evolution before man but for the fact that a concession as to the truth of evolution up to man furnishes our opponents with an argument which they are quick to use, namely, if evolution accounts for all the species up to man, does it not raise a presumption in behalf of evolution to include man?" He considered defining the days in Genesis 1 to be twenty-four hours to be a pro-evolution straw man argument to make attacking creationists easier, and admitted under questioning at the Scopes trial that the world was far older than six thousand years, and that the days of creation were probably longer than twenty-four hours each.

American Baptist preacher and anti-evolution campaigner William Bell Riley, "The Grand Old Man of Fundamentalism", founder of the World Christian Fundamentals Association and of the Anti-Evolution League of America was another prominent day-age creationist in the first half of the 20th century, who defended this position in a famous debate with friend and prominent young Earth creationist Harry Rimmer.

Types

Gap creationism

Gap creationism is a form of old Earth creationism which posits the belief that the six-yom creation period, as described in the Book of Genesis, involved six literal 24-hour days, but that there was a gap of time between two distinct creations in the first and second verses of Genesis, which the theory states explains many scientific observations, including the age of the Earth. This view was popularized in 1909 by the Scofield Reference Bible.

Progressive creationism

Progressive creationism is the religious belief that God created new forms of life gradually over a period of hundreds of millions of years. As a form of Old Earth creationism, it accepts mainstream geological and cosmological estimates for the age of the Earth, some tenets of biology such as microevolution as well as archaeology to make its case. In this view creation occurred in rapid bursts in which all "kinds" of plants and animals appear in stages lasting millions of years. The bursts are followed by periods of stasis or equilibrium to accommodate new arrivals. These bursts represent instances of God creating new types of organisms by divine intervention. As viewed from the archaeological record, progressive creationism holds that "species do not gradually appear by the steady transformation of its ancestors; [but] appear all at once and "fully formed." Thus the evidence for macroevolution is claimed to be false, but microevolution is accepted as a genetic parameter designed by the Creator into the fabric of genetics to allow for environmental adaptations and survival. Generally, it is viewed by proponents as a middle ground between literal creationism and evolution.

Approaches to Genesis 1
Old Earth Christian creationists may approach the creation accounts of Genesis in a number of different ways.

Framework interpretation 

The framework interpretation (or framework hypothesis) notes that there is a pattern or "framework" present in the Genesis account and that, because of this, the account may not have been intended as a strict chronological record of creation. Instead, the creative events may be presented in a topical order. This view is broad enough that proponents of other old earth views (such as many Day-Age creationists) have no problem with many of the key points put forward by the hypothesis, though they might believe that there is a certain degree of chronology present.

Day-age creationism

Day-age creationism is an effort to reconcile the literal Genesis account of creation with modern scientific theories on the age of the universe, the Earth, life, and humans. It holds that the six days referred to in the Genesis account of creation are not ordinary 24-hour days, but rather are much longer periods (of thousands or millions of years). The Genesis account is then interpreted as an account of the process of cosmic evolution, providing a broad base on which any number of theories and interpretations are built. Proponents of the day-age theory can be found among theistic evolutionists and progressive creationists.

The day-age theory tries to reconcile these views by arguing that the creation "days" were not ordinary 24-hour days, but actually lasted for long periods of time—or as the theory's name implies: the "days" each lasted an age. Most advocates of old Earth creationism hold that the six days referred to in the creation account given in Genesis are not ordinary 24-hour days, as the Hebrew word for "day" (yom) can be interpreted in this context to mean a long period of time (thousands or millions of years) rather than a 24-hour day. According to this view, the sequence and duration of the creation "days" is representative or symbolic of the sequence and duration of events that scientists theorize to have happened, such that Genesis can be read as a summary of modern science, simplified for the benefit of pre-scientific humans.

Cosmic time
Gerald Schroeder puts forth a view which reconciles 24-hour creation days with an age of billions of years for the universe by noting, as creationist Phillip E. Johnson summarizes in his article "What Would Newton Do?": "the Bible speaks of time from the viewpoint of the universe as a whole, which Schroeder interprets to mean at the moment of 'quark confinement,' when stable matter formed from energy early in the first second of the big bang." Schroeder calculates that a period of six days under the conditions of quark confinement, when the universe was approximately a trillion times smaller and hotter than it is today is equal to fifteen billion years of earth time today. This is all due to space expansion after quark confinement. Thus Genesis and modern physics are reconciled.  Schroeder, though, states in an earlier book, Genesis and the Big Bang, that the Earth and solar system is some "4.5 to 5 billion years" old and also states in a later book, The Science of God, that the Sun is 4.6 billion years old.

The biblical flood 

Some old Earth creationists reject flood geology, a position which leaves them open to accusations that they thereby reject the infallibility of scripture (which states that the Genesis flood covered the whole of the earth).  In response, old Earth creationists cite verses in the Bible where the words "whole" and "all" clearly require a contextual interpretation.  Old Earth creationists generally believe that the human race was localised around the Middle East at the time of the Genesis flood, a position which is in conflict with the Out of Africa theory.

Criticism
Old Earth creationism has received criticism from some secular communities and proponents of theistic evolution for rejecting evolution, as well as criticism from young Earth creationists for not interpreting the six-yom period as six literal 24-hour days of the Genesis creation narrative and for believing in death and suffering before the fall.

See also
 Biblical cosmology
 Cosmogony
 Creation science
 Dating creation
 Directed panspermia
 Hindu creationism
 Pre-Adamite
 Timeline of epochs in cosmology

Notes

References

Further reading

Schroeder, Gerald, Genesis and the Big Bang Theory: The Discovery of Harmony Between Modern Science and the Bible, 1991,  (articulates old Earth creationism)
 Hagopian, David G., editor, The Genesis Debate: Three Views on the Days of Creation, 2000,  (Three pairs of scholars present and debate the three most widespread evangelical interpretations of the creation days)
 Hayward, Alan, Creation and Evolution: Rethinking the Evidence from Science and the Bible, 1995,  (by a Christadelphian old-earth creationist)
Ross, Hugh, A Matter of Days: Resolving a Creation Controversy, 2004,  (Details why old Earth creationism is the literal Biblical view)
Ross, Hugh, The Genesis Question: Scientific Advances and the Accuracy of Genesis, 2001,  (Details the agreement of science with old Earth creationism)
 Sarfati, Jonathan, Refuting Compromise: A Biblical and Scientific Refutation of "Progressive Creationism" (Billions of Years), As Popularized by Astronomer Hugh Ross, 2004, 2011, (critique of old-earth creationism, in particular that of Ross, Hugh. Sarfati released an updated book in 2011, the original book was published in 2004.)